This is a list of battles and wars that involved and occurred in Bangladesh, and Bengal ( that includes both Indian State of West Bengal and Bangladesh ) throughout different periods in history. Most of the battles and wars occurred when the modern area of Bengal was under different empires, especially the Mughal Empire and the British Empire, and the Bengalis served in both the Mughal and the British militaries. Since the independence of Bangladesh in 1971, it has its own military.

Pala Empire (750–1200) 

The Pala Empire is famous for the conquest of Kannuj held by Dharmapala by fighting a war Gujara Prahi, this war was also known as the great war

Sena dynasty (1070–1230) 

The Sena dynasty was a Hindu dynasty.

Bengal Sultanate (1338–1576) 

Bengal became independent from the Delhi Sultanate in 1338, and remained independent till 1576 (except for brief Mughal and Afghan occupations in the 1540s). During this period, the Bengal Sultanate had its own military, and took part in various wars and armed conflicts.

Bengal Subah (1576–1717) 

In 1576, the Mughal Empire conquered Bengal and turned it into a province of the empire. The Mughal rule continued until 1717, when Mughal Subadar (provincial governor) Murshid Quli Khan declared the independence of Bengal. During this period, Bengalis served in the Mughal military, and took part in manh wars undertaken by the Mughals.

Nawab of Bengal (1717–1765) 

In 1717, Murshid Quli Khan, who was the provincial governor of the Mughal province of Bengal, taking advantage of the weakness of the declining Mughal Empire, declared the independence of Bengal and established himself as the Nawab of Bengal. Bengal remained independent until 1764, when the British annexed the region. During this period, Bengal had its own military, and Bengalis served in it.

Bengal Presidency (1765–1947)

East Bengal (1947–1955) 

In 1947, East Bengal became a province of the newly established state of Pakistan, and retained this name till 1955. During this period, Bengalis served in the Pakistani military and took part in various conflicts involving Pakistan.

East Pakistan (1955–1971) 

East Bengal was renamed East Pakistan in 1955, and it became one of the two units of Pakistan under the Pakistani policy of 'One Unit'. East Pakistan remained a part of Pakistan till 1971. During this period, Bengalis continued to serve in the Pakistani military and took part in the wars in which Pakistan participated during this period.

Provisional Government of Bangladesh (1971–1972)

Bangladesh (1972–present)

See also 
 History of Bengal
 Military history of Bangladesh
 Bangladesh Armed Forces

References

External links
 Bangladesh Official Army website
 https://www.youtube.com/watch?v=dsN0aRn0Wh0

Wars
Bangladesh
Military history of Bangladesh
Wars